Ellen F. Eglin (before 1849 – after 1890) was an African-American inventor who revolutionized the chore of laundry with the invention of the clothes wringer for washing machines and, in the process, made her mark on African Americans and women's history.

Personal 
Little has been recorded about Eglin's early life, which was a common theme among many early Black women inventors. Ellen F. Eglin was born in the state of Maryland in February 1836, according to the 1880 Census.[1] At some time, she and her family moved to Washington, D.C., where Eglin made her living as a housekeeper and a government employee. She is unlisted in 1850 - 1870 census records. Later records show her to have been born in Washington, D.C., in 1849, although some experts disagree, labeling her birth in Maryland in 1836. As a young adult, she worked as a clerk in the local census office and also spent time as a domestic. As a housekeeper, Eglin passed several hours engaged in backbreaking laundry work. The task of scrubbing clothes by hand on a washboard and then wringing out the water afterwards ignited Eglin's desire to improve the laundry process, which sparked the idea of a new invention.

Invention 

In 1888, Eglin invented her groundbreaking device, a special type of clothes-wringer, which was a machine that had two wooden rollers attached to a crank; after being washed and rinsed, wet clothes were fed between these rollers and an immense amount of water was squeezed out. The clothes were then hung to dry, a process which took significantly less time due to the wringer. Although the design was perceived as a popular product well into the 20th century, Eglin received almost no credit or financial success of her own invention. At the time, few innovators could claim the rights to their inventions and Eglin's race further complicated her success. For the April 1890 issue of The Women inventor, a short-lived magazine for highlighting female inventors that was by feminist reformer Charlotte, a reporter asked Eglin why she sold the rights of the invention at such a minimal cost. Eglin stated, "You know I am Black and if it was known that a negro woman patented the invention, white ladies would not buy the wringer. I was afraid to be known because of my color in having it introduced to the market that is the only reason."” Eglin's knowledge that racial bias would prevent the clothes-wringer's success caused her to sell the design to an unknown white agent for $18. The buyer went on to reap considerable financial awards. By 1900, Eglin's invention found a home with the American Wringer Company. The company grew rich from profits earned from Eglin's invention. Eglin's wringer is still used for mops today.

Later work 
After selling her clothes-wringer, Eglin was planning on creating another invention and planned to patent it in her own name. She wanted that "the invention will be known as a black woman's," something that would inspire African American women of the upcoming generation. Although she wanted to exhibit the new model at the Women's International Industrial Inventors Congress (WIIIC), where, anyone was invented regardless of race, she never went on to patent it. Unfortunately, Eglin never appeared at the WIIIC and the mystery invention was never documented. It is rumored that she went on to work as a clerk in a census office.

Last years
Little is known about the later stages of Ellen Eglin's life, including the place or date of her death. Ellen Eglin appears to have spent the rest of her life in Washington, D. C. In 1890, she was employed by the United States Department of the Interior as a charwoman in the Census Office She appeared in the local city directories from about 1888 living at 1929 11th Street, N. W. with her brother Charles, a Union Navy veteran who was a teamster. Charles Eglin died in July 1896, leaving his estate divided between his three siblings, including Ellen.

Ellen Eglin last appears in the Washington city directories in 1916.

References

External sources
 Patent of a Clothes Wringer from 1888
 Magazine showcasing Ellen Eglin

People from Washington, D.C.
African-American inventors
19th-century American inventors
Women inventors
1916 deaths
1836 births
19th-century American businesspeople
19th-century American businesswomen
20th-century African-American people
20th-century African-American women